Davor Vugrinec (born 24 March 1975) is a Croatian former professional footballer. He primarily played as a striker, but also operated as an attacking midfielder or a second striker. He is all-time top scorer of the Croatian First Football League with 146 goals he has scored for five different clubs and also the oldest player to score a goal in the league, netting for Slaven Belupo 10 days before his 40th birthday.

Vugrinec is currently the vice-president of NK Varaždin, a different organization from the defunct (as of 2015) Varteks / Varaždin club he was with during his playing career.

Club career

Early years
Vugrinec started his professional career at local club NK Varteks in 1992, becoming a regular at the club from his second professional season onwards, and scoring in double digits in three of the following four campaigns. In 1995–96, he netted 17 goals in 31 games as the team finished in fourth position (third after the second stage), also appearing in the season's Croatian Cup final.

Turkey / Italy
In June 1997, Vugrinec moved abroad, joining Trabzonspor in Turkey, scoring 24 Süper Lig goals in his first two seasons combined. In the 2000 summer, he moved teams and countries again, signing with U.S. Lecce in Italy, his 11 successful strikes proving crucial as the Apulia outfit narrowly avoided relegation from Serie A; on 12 November 2000, he netted the game's only goal at the San Siro, in an historic win against F.C. Internazionale Milano.

2002–03 saw Lecce in Serie B, but Vugrinec returned to the top level in January 2003, joining Atalanta BC. The last of his five seasons in the country was spent in division two, with Calcio Catania (less than half of the league games, no promotion).

Return home
Subsequently, Vugrinec returned to Croatia and signed with NK Rijeka. Together with Ahmad Sharbini, he was the club's top goalscorer in 2005–06's top division (15 goals apiece), and also helped the team win the domestic cup by scoring the crucial goal in the second-leg match against former club Varteks (Rijeka lost 1–5 away after winning 4–0 in the first leg – with two goals from him – thus overcoming on away goals).

Vugrinec joined NK Dinamo Zagreb in early June 2006 and made his official debut for the club on 19 July, in the Croatian Supercup against his previous club Rijeka, assisting for two goals in a 4–1 win. He went on to score his first goals for Dinamo in the UEFA Champions League qualifier against FK Ekranas and the team's first domestic league match of the 2006–07 season, against NK Slaven Belupo. He suffered an injury in a home fixture against HNK Šibenik on 4 August, but managed to recover for the club's first-leg third-round Champions League clash against Arsenal four days later, only to be stretchered off 30 minutes into the game, missing the second match.

Vugrinec joined neighbouring NK Zagreb for the 2008–09 season, returning to Varteks, renamed NK Varaždin, two years later, at the age of 35. In March 2012, he terminated his contract with the team, ranking second best all-time goalscorer in the Croatian top division with a total of 124 goals scored. During the same month, Vugrinec joined Slaven Belupo and scored in his debut against Osijek.

International career
Vugrinec made his debut for Croatia on 10 April 1996, in a friendly match with Hungary played in Osijek, but had to wait two 1/2 years to win his second international cap, in the nation's second UEFA Euro 2000 qualifier away against Malta, on 10 October 1998; he entered the match as an early substitute after injury forced off Jurica Vučko in the 16th minute and went on to score two goals in the second half, as the national team came from behind to win it 4–1.

In 2000, Vugrinec became a regular in the main squad, and went on to appear in seven out of possible eight qualifying matches for the 2002 FIFA World Cup. He scored two goals during the campaign, as he was on target against Latvia and San Marino respectively (both home fixtures), and was subsequently part of the final stages' squad, appearing in two games in an eventual group stage exit: he started the second match against Italy, but was replaced in the 57th minute, and also played in the final one against Ecuador as an early second-half substitute.

After the tournament in Japan and South Korea, Vugrinec only appeared in one friendly match and two Euro 2004 qualifiers before being uncapped for more than three years, until January 2006. He made his international comeback by appearing in two matches at the Carlsberg Cup in Hong Kong, thus applying for a spot in the final squad of 23 at the 2006 World Cup, especially after scoring a hat-trick in Rijeka's 4–0 league win at HNK Hajduk Split, but was eventually omitted. He earned a total of 28 caps, scoring 7 goals.

International appearances

International goals

Personal life
An art collector, he owns the Kolekcije Vugrinec in his gallery in Zagreb. He is married to curator and museum advisor Petra and they have one daughter together, while he also has three kids from his first marriage to Nina. Among them, his son Noa signed professional terms with NK Varaždin in 2021.

Career statistics

As a player

Honours
Varteks / Varaždin
Croatian Football Cup runner-up: 1995–96, 2010–11

Rijeka
Croatian Football Cup: 2005–06

Dinamo Zagreb
Prva HNL: 2006–07, 2007–08
Croatian Football Cup: 2006–07, 2007–08
Super Cup: 2006

Individual
Prva HNL Top Scorer: 2009–10
Prva HNL All-Time Top Scorer: 146 goals
Croatian Football Cup All-Time Top Scorer: 34 goals
Most hat-tricks in Prva HNL

References

External links
 

1975 births
Living people
Sportspeople from Varaždin
Association football forwards
Croatian footballers
Croatia youth international footballers
Croatia under-21 international footballers
Croatia B international footballers
Croatia international footballers
2002 FIFA World Cup players
NK Varaždin players
Trabzonspor footballers
U.S. Lecce players
Atalanta B.C. players
Catania S.S.D. players
HNK Rijeka players
GNK Dinamo Zagreb players
NK Zagreb players
NK Slaven Belupo players
Croatian Football League players
Süper Lig players
Serie A players
Serie B players
Croatian expatriate footballers
Expatriate footballers in Turkey
Croatian expatriate sportspeople in Turkey
Expatriate footballers in Italy
Croatian expatriate sportspeople in Italy
Croatian art collectors